The women's doubles tournament at the 1968 French Open was held from 27 May to 9 June 1968 on the outdoor clay courts at the Stade Roland Garros in Paris, France. The second-seeded team of Françoise Dürr and Ann Jones won the title, defeating the first-seeded pair of Rosie Casals and Billie Jean King in the final in three sets.

Seeds

Draw

Finals

Top half

Bottom half

References

External links
 Main draw
1968 French Open – Women's draws and results at the International Tennis Federation

Women's Doubles
French Open by year – Women's doubles
1968 in women's tennis
1968 in French women's sport